= Pseudo-operation =

Pseudo-operation can refer to:

- A false flag operation, a covert military or paramilitary operation
- In computer programming, an assembly language directive
